Vladimir Pavlovich Basov (28 July 192317 September 1987) was a Soviet Russian actor, film director and screenwriter. People's Artist of the USSR (1983).

Biography
Vladimir Basov was born in the Urazovo village, Voronezh Governorate (now Belgorod Oblast) to Pavel Basov (Basultainen) and Aleksandra Basova. His father was a Tartu alumnus of Finnish ethnicity who joined Bolsheviks during the revolution. "Basov" was his party alias later adopted as a family name. He served as an officer and political commissar up until his death in 1931. Vladimir's mother Aleksandra Ivanovna was a daughter of a Russian Orthodox priest from Pokrovsk. She met Pavel during the Civil War; he was a runaway and asked for shelter. During the 1920s she taught peasant children Russian language and literature. According to Vladimir Basov Jr., his father had Russian, Finnish and Georgian roots.

In 1941 Vladimir Basov joined the Great Patriotic War. He served in the Red Army as an artillery officer, mortar battery commander, then, as a staff officer in the 28th Special Artillery Division in the rank of Kapitan. He was awarded the Medal "For Battle Merit" in 1943 and the Order of the Red Star in 1945 for displaying outstanding heroism during the capture of a Nazi military base. He was wounded in action, but continued serving until the war ended.

In 1947 Basov entered VGIK. He studied direction under Sergei Yutkevich and Mikhail Romm and graduated in 1952 to work on the Mosfilm studio. As a director Basov made 18 films, and one teleplay. Among his most acclaimed pictures is the TV adaption of Mikhail Bulgakov's play The Days of the Turbins and a big-screen spy thriller The Shield and the Sword (1968) which he also co-wrote. He is credited with writing screenplays to most of his movies.

In 1963 his friend Georgiy Daneliya offered a small part in the upcoming film Walking the Streets of Moscow (1963). Basov quickly turned into one of the most beloved Soviet comedy actors. He usually portrayed episodic, but distinguishing characters running some shady businesses, such as the lonely official in Moscow Does Not Believe in Tears. Among his bigger roles is Viktor Myshlaevsky in The Days of the Turbins (1976), Huck Finn's father in Hopelessly Lost (1973), Duremar in The Adventures of Buratino (1975), Pyotr Luzhin in Crime and Punishment (1969), Artur Arturovich in The Flight (1970), Stump in The Adventures of the Elektronic (1979). He also voiced a number of popular animated cartoons.

His busy schedule mixed with heavy drinking resulted in serious health problems during the 1980s. In 1983 he survived a stroke that led to complete paralysis of half of his body, yet he continued working. Basov died after the second stroke in 1987. He was buried on the Kuntsevo Cemetery.

A member of the Communist Party since 1948.

Personal life
Vladimir Basov was married three times to three Soviet actresses. His first wife was Roza Makagonova (1927-1995). They met while studying at VGIK. They had no children.

His second marriage was to Natalya Fateyeva. They had one son - Vladimir Basov Jr. (born 1959), also a prominent actor and film director.

His last wife was Valentina Titova. Their son Aleksandr Basov (born 1965) is a Russian film director as well, while their daughter Yelizaveta (born 1971) finished dance courses.

Selected filmography

References

External links

 
1923 births
1987 deaths
20th-century Russian male actors
People from Valuysky District
Communist Party of the Soviet Union members
Gerasimov Institute of Cinematography alumni
People's Artists of the RSFSR
People's Artists of the USSR
Recipients of the Order of the Red Banner of Labour
Recipients of the Order of the Red Star
Recipients of the Vasilyev Brothers State Prize of the RSFSR
Russian film directors
Russian male film actors
Russian male voice actors
20th-century Russian screenwriters
Male screenwriters
20th-century Russian male writers
Soviet people of Finnish descent
Soviet film directors
Soviet male film actors
Soviet male voice actors
Soviet military personnel of World War II
Soviet screenwriters
Burials at Kuntsevo Cemetery